Baadsvik is a Norwegian surname. Notable people with the surname include:

Emily Baadsvik (born 1983), Canadian bobsledder
Karl Johan Baadsvik (1910–1995), Canadian skier
Øystein Baadsvik (born 1966), Norwegian classical tubist

Norwegian-language surnames
de:Baadsvik